Hangzhong Road is a station on Line 10 of the Shanghai Metro. It began operation in April 2010 and is the western terminus of the branch line of Line 10.

This station has 2 platforms, but only one is in regular service.

References 
 

Railway stations in Shanghai
Line 10, Shanghai Metro
Railway stations in China opened in 2010
Shanghai Metro stations in Minhang District